Robert Littlejohn may refer to:
Robert Littlejohn (gardener) (1756–1818), Van Diemen's Land gardener in what is now Tasmania, Australia
Robert Grayson Littlejohn, American physicist 
Robert McGowan Littlejohn  (1890–1982), American military officer